The Black was a brass era United States automobile, built at 124 East Ohio Street, Chicago, Illinois, in 1906.

It was a high wheeler buggy priced at a surprisingly low US$375-$450, when Gale's Model A was US$500, the high-volume Oldsmobile Runabout went for US$650, and the Ford "Doctor's Car" was US$850.

The Black featured a 10 hp (7.5 kW) two-cylinder air-cooled gasoline engine, chain drive, wheel steering and (unusual for the era) double brakes. It bragged speeds of 2-25 mph (3.2–40 km/h) and mileage of 30mpg (12.75 L/100 km).

Surreys and "top motor buggies" were also advertised.

Black Crow and Chicago Motor Buggy
From 1909 to 1911, Black sold a rebadged Crow-Elkhart automobile as the "Black Crow".  In addition to Black and Black Crow names, during 1908 and 1909, the company also sold a two-cylinder, high-wheeler under the Chicago Motor Buggy name.

See also 
List of defunct United States automobile manufacturers
List of automobile manufacturers
List of car brands

References

Sources
Clymer, Floyd. Treasury of Early American Automobiles, 1877–1925 (New York: Bonanza Books, 1950), p. 32.
Kimes, Beverly. Standard Catalog of American Cars 1805-1942. Iola, WI:  Krause Publications, 1996. 
Wise, David Burgess. The New Illustrated Encyclopedia of Automobiles. 

Brass Era vehicles
Motor vehicle manufacturers based in Illinois
Defunct motor vehicle manufacturers of the United States
1900s cars
History of Chicago
Defunct manufacturing companies based in Chicago
1906 establishments in Illinois

Highwheeler